is a city located in the western portion of Tokyo Metropolis, Japan.

Geography
Tama is located in the foothills of the Okutama Mountains of southwestern Tokyo, known as Tama Hills, which spans Tokyo and Kanagawa Prefecture. The entire region is historically referred to as Tama; therefore there are many place names scattered throughout the area with references to the name "Tama" which are not within the city limits. The Tama River marks the city's northern boundary, and Kanagawa Prefecture is to the south. Its southern half forms part of the Tama New Town project, Japan's largest residential development, constructed in the 1970s.

Surrounding municipalities
Tokyo Metropolis
Inagi
Fuchū
Hachiōji
Machida
Hino
Kanagawa Prefecture
Kawasaki

Climate
Tama has a Humid subtropical climate (Köppen Cfa) characterized by warm summers and cool winters with light to no snowfall.  The average annual temperature in Tama is 14.0 °C. The average annual rainfall is 1647 mm with September as the wettest month. The temperatures are highest on average in August, at around 25.3 °C, and lowest in January, at around 2.8 °C.

Demographics
Per Japanese census data, the population of Tama increased very rapidly in the 1970s and 1980s.

History
 The area of present-day Tama was part of ancient Musashi Province. In the post-Meiji Restoration cadastral reform of July 22, 1878, the area became part of Minamitama District in Kanagawa Prefecture.
 Tama Village was founded on April 1, 1889 from the merger of 11 pre-Meiji period hamlets with the establishment of the modern municipalities system.
 Minamitama District was transferred to the administrative control of Tokyo Metropolis on April 1, 1893.
 Tama was elevated to town status on April 1, 1964. Construction of Tama New Town began in 1966, and the first occupants started moving in 1971.
 On November 1, 1971, Tama Town was reclassified as Tama City, dissolving Minamitama District. Tama was the last town in the former Minamitama District.

Government
Tama has a mayor-council form of government with a directly elected mayor and a unicameral city council of 26 members. Tama, together with the city of Inagi, contributes two members to the Tokyo Metropolitan Assembly. In terms of national politics, the city is divided between Tokyo 21st district and Tokyo 23rd district of the lower house of the Diet of Japan.

Election
In 2018, an activist named Michihito Matsuda ran for mayor in the Tama city area of Tokyo as a human proxy for an artificial intelligence program. While election posters and campaign material used the term robot, and displayed stock images of a feminine android, the "AI mayor" was in fact a machine learning algorithm trained using Tama city datasets. The project was backed by high-profile executives Tetsuzo Matsumoto of Softbank and Norio Murakami of Google. Michihito Matsuda came third in the election, being defeated by Hiroyuki Abe. Organisers claimed that the 'AI mayor' was programmed to analyze citizen petitions put forward to the city council in a more 'fair and balanced' way than human politicians.
In 2022, Michihito Matsuda made the campaign pledge to install THXU token into Tama city's further development as one of Government by algorithm.

Economy
Several companies have their headquarters in the city:
Keio Corporation
Mitsumi Electric
JUKI

Education

Universities and colleges
Keisen University Tama Campus
Kokushikan University Tama Campus
Otsuma Women's University Tama Campus
Tama University Tama Campus
Teikyo University Hachioji Campus
University of Tokyo Health Sciences
National Farmer's Academy

Elementary and secondary schools
The Tokyo Metropolitan Government Board of Education operates , the one public high school.

The Tama city government operates 17 public elementary and nine public junior high schools.

Municipal junior high schools:
 Higashi Atago (東愛宕中学校)
 Hijirigaoka (聖ヶ丘中学校)
 Ochiai (落合中学校)
 Seiryo (青陵中学校)
 Suwa (諏訪中学校)
 Tama (多摩中学校)
 Tama Nagayama (多摩永山中学校)
 Tsurumaki (鶴牧中学校)
 Wada (和田中学校)

Municipal elementary schools:
 Aiwa (愛和小学校)
 Higashi Ochiai (東落合小学校)
 Higashiteragata (東寺方小学校)
 Hijirigaoka (聖ヶ丘小学校)
 Kaidori (貝取小学校)
 Kitasuwa (北諏訪小学校)
 Minami Tsurumaki (南鶴牧小学校)
 Nagayama (永山小学校)
 Nishiochiai (西落合小学校)
 Omatsudai (大松台小学校)
 Renkoji (連光寺小学校)
 Suwa (諏訪小学校)
 Tama No. 1 (多摩第一小学校)
 Tama No. 2 (多摩第二小学校)
 Tama No. 3 (多摩第三小学校)
 Toyogaoka (豊ヶ丘小学校)
 Uryu (瓜生小学校)

There is also one private elementary school and one private junior high school, and two private combined junior/senior high schools.
  - Girls' school

Transportation

Railway
 Keio Corporation -   Keiō Line

 Keio Corporation -   Keiō Sagamihara Line
 - 
 Odakyu Electric Railway - Odakyū Tama Line
 -  - 
 Tama Monorail

Highway
Tama is not served by any national expressways or national highways

Military facilities
Tama Hills, a recreational facility of the U.S. Air Force, intended for use by United States service members and their families, as well as Japan Maritime Self-Defense Force service members and their families.

Local attractions
 Sanrio Puroland Amusement Park
Thirteen Buddhas of Tama

Sister cities
  -  Fujimi, Nagano in Japan.

References

External links

Tama City Official Website 

 
Cities in Tokyo
Western Tokyo